At the 2006 South American Games 18 judo events were held, 9 in both genders. The first eight events were held on 9 November, while to others took place on 10 November.

Men's results

Women's results

Medal count

References

2006 South American Games events
American Games, South
2006
2006 American Games, South